The following television stations operate on virtual channel 11 in Canada:

 CBAFT-DT in Moncton, New Brunswick
 CBVT-DT in Quebec City, Quebec
 CBXFT-DT in Edmonton, Alberta
 CFGC-DT in Sudbury, Ontario
 CFRE-DT in Regina, Saskatchewan
 CFTF-DT-6 in Rivière-du-Loup, Quebec
 CHAU-DT-8 in Cloridorme, Quebec
 CHCH-DT in Hamilton, Ontario
 CHCH-DT-1 in Ottawa, Ontario
 CHNB-DT-1 in Fredericton, New Brunswick
 CKMI-DT-2 in Sherbrooke, Quebec
 CKWS-DT in Kingston, Ontario

11 virtual TV stations in Canada